The Corbett Park Link Express is an Express train belonging to North Western Railway zone that runs between  and  in India. It is currently being operated with 25013/25014 train numbers on a daily basis.

Service

The 25013/Corbett Park Link Express has an average speed of 43 km/hr and covers 1217 km in 28h 5m.
The 25014/Corbett Park Link Express has an average speed of 48 km/hr and covers 1217 km in 25h 15m.

Route and halts 

The important halts of the train are:

Coach composition

The train has standard ICF rakes with a max speed of 110 kmph. The train consists of 8 coaches:

 1 AC II Tier
 1 AC III Tier
 2 Sleeper coaches
 3 General Unreserved
 1 Seating cum Luggage Rake

Traction

Both trains are hauled by an Izzatnagar Loco Shed-based WDP-4D diesel locomotive from Jaisalmer to Moradabad. From Moradabad train is hauled by a  Tuglakabad Loco Shed-based WDM-3A until Ramnagar and vice versa.

Rake sharing

The train is attached to Ranikhet Express at Moradabad and runs as Ranikhet Express until Jaisalmer.

See also 

 Jaisalmer railway station
 Ramnagar railway station
 Ranikhet Express

References

Notes

External links 

 25013/Corbett Park Link Express India Rail Info
 25014/Corbett Park Link Express India Rail Info

Transport in Jaisalmer
Transport in Ramnagar
Named passenger trains of India
Rail transport in Uttarakhand
Rail transport in Uttar Pradesh
Rail transport in Delhi
Rail transport in Haryana
Rail transport in Rajasthan